Hansjörg Rey, aka Hans "No Way" Rey (born 4 June 1966) is a pioneer in mountain bike trials and extreme mountain biking also known as Freeride /"Freeriding". Rey began riding in the late 70's, since 1987, he has ridden exclusively on GT bikes.  In 1999, he was inducted to the Mountain Bike Hall of Fame.

Hans Rey, born and raised in Emmendingen, Germany; is a citizen of Switzerland and, since 2008, he is also a USA citizen.  He lives in Laguna Beach California with his wife Carmen.

Career
Over the years he has won a large number of bike trials riding championships, including German, Swiss and USA National Champion, NORBA World Champ, Winner of the UCI World Champs, and Bike Trial Union Vice World Champ, Bronze Medal MTB Slalom Worlds, and X Games Silver Medal winner in the Trials in 1995 when the X Games were known as the ESPN Extreme Games; but since 1997, has retired from competitive sports to explore the world on his mountain bike adventures.

He is the only permanent member of the "Hans Rey Adventure Team", a quest to explore the world using his mountain bike talent always in search of something historical or mysterious.  These trips are often filmed for television and the stories have been published in magazines all over the world. He has traveled to over 70 countries and has been featured on approx. 400 magazine covers.  He has done a first descent on bikes of Mount Kenya, traversed the Sinai Desert in the footsteps of Moses, created the No Way Transalp route, searched for headhunters in Borneo, ridden the Inca Trail to Machu Picchu, ridden the Roop Kund trek in the Indian Himalayas, Bike Safari in Botswana, circumnavigation of Mount Kilimanjaro, Rubicon Trail in California, searched for the mysterious Dropa tribe in China, Wadi Rum Desert in Jordan, Cuba's Sierra Maestra Mountains, Annapurna Trek in Nepal, Copper Canyon Mexico, 5 volcanos in 5 days in Ecuador, Haute Route in France/Switzerland and many more glaciers, volcanos and treks.  In 2016 Rey climbed and rode Mount Kenya and Mount Kilimanjaro back to back.

In 2017 Rey started his "Urban Adventure" series with his "TransAngeles" project, a 5-day ride across Los Angeles. Followed by TransNapoli, TransHongKong and in Oct.21 w 'Slay The Bay' in San Francisco. Most of his adventure documentaries are featured on his YouTube Channel.

Rey made a name for himself with a number of publicity stunts on this bike, like a photoshoot in gridlock traffic on the 405 Freeway near Los Angeles on top of car, bungy jumps with his bike, his wild ride on ropes down a 14-story skyscraper in New Zealand, his legendary ride along the 600 ft. high ledge at the Cliffs of Moher and his bike dance on the volcano in Hawaii surrounded by hot lava on the edge of a boiling ocean.

Hans was one of the first to produce action videos of his trials biking and extreme biking skills, including his own VHS series from 1992 to 1996: "Hans No Way Rey", "Level Vibes", Monkey See - Monkey Do" and "Big Five".  He has also starred in movies like Tread (1994), and made guest appearances and stunt work on the TV series Pacific Blue (1995-1998).  He was also part of the closing ceremony of the 1996 Olympic Games, appeared in Willy Bogner Fire, Ice and Dynamite and White Magic films.

In 2005 Hans Rey founded Wheels4Life, a non-profit charity that provides bicycles to people in Developing Countries in need of transportation.  More info can be found wheels4life.org. By 2021 over 15,000 bicycles have been given to students, healthcare workers and farmers in 32 different countries.  Hans and his wife Carmen run the charity as volunteers along with supporters from around the world. 

Hans Rey is also an honorary board member and long time supporter of IMBA, the International Mountain Bicycling Association, he has been a big supporter of purpose-built biking trails, especially Flow Trails.  In 2008, he coined the term Flow Country Trail together with trail guru Diddie Schneider and Flow Country Trails is a certain kind of flow trail that is never steep, extreme or dangerous. It can be ridden by all skill levels and on any kind of mountain bike. *Flow Country Link

Hans consults and promotes tourism destinations from around the world, he was also a founding member and consultant of the first ever mountain bike touring company ALPStours in Germany in 1990 - long before travel w an MTB became popular.

Rey is doing more and more talks and motivational keynote speeches at all kinds of events.

Sponsors: Hans Rey's sponsors include GT Bicycles - their partnership (since 1987) is one of the longest standing sponsorship relationships in the entire cycling, action sports and outdoor industry, Adidas FiveTen TERREX since 1993, Shimano since 1988, since 2017, Rey is a Shimano eBike ambassador, LUK Automotive Systems since 1992, Crank Brothers components, SR Suntour suspension, Carosello 3000, Livigno Bike Resort, Clif Bar, SQ-Lab saddles, Stans No Tubes wheels, iXS protection, Adidas Eyewear, Deuter backpacks. He was also sponsored by Swatch as part of the SwatchProTeam for 19 years.

External links
 Hans Rey Official Site
 Wheels4Life Charity

1966 births
Living people
People from Emmendingen (district)
Sportspeople from Freiburg (region)
German male cyclists
Mountain bike trials riders
Mountain bike innovators
Cyclists from Baden-Württemberg
Freeride mountain bikers
German emigrants to the United States